Karla Ferreira Cardoso (born November 18, 1981) is a partially blind Brazilian judoka who plays in international level events. She is a double silver Paralympic medalist, two time Parapan American Games champion and double bronze World medalist.

References

1981 births
Living people
Sportspeople from Rio de Janeiro (city)
Paralympic judoka of Brazil
Judoka at the 2004 Summer Paralympics
Judoka at the 2008 Summer Paralympics
Judoka at the 2012 Summer Paralympics
Judoka at the 2016 Summer Paralympics
Medalists at the 2004 Summer Paralympics
Medalists at the 2008 Summer Paralympics
Paralympic silver medalists for Brazil
Paralympic medalists in judo
Medalists at the 2007 Parapan American Games
Medalists at the 2015 Parapan American Games
Medalists at the 2019 Parapan American Games
Brazilian female judoka
20th-century Brazilian women
21st-century Brazilian women